Eriocapitella rupicola, a species of flowering plant in the buttercup family Ranunculaceae, is native to Asia. The specific epithet rupicola means "growing on rocks". In Chinese, a common name is yan sheng yin lian hua, which means "rock anemone".

Taxonomy

Eriocapitella rupicola was described by Maarten J. M. Christenhusz and James W. Byng in 2018. Like other members of genus Eriocapitella, E. rupicola was formerly a member of genus Anemone. The basionym Anemone rupicola Cambess. was described in 1844.

Cultivation

The cultivar Eriocapitella rupicola 'Wild Swan' won the Plant of the Year Award at the Chelsea Flower Show in 2011. It is said to be a cross between E. rupicola and E. hupehensis.

Bibliography

References

External links

 
 

rupicola
Flora of Asia
Plants described in 2018
Taxa named by Maarten J. M. Christenhusz
Taxa named by James W. Byng